Tervarit is a football club based in Oulu, Finland. It plays currently in the Finnish fourth tier Kolmonen.

Notable former players 
 Mark Dziadulewicz
 Raphael Edereho
 Otto Fredrikson
 Ismaila Jagne
 Jani Kauppila
 Juho Mäkelä
 Patrice Ollo
 Brent Sancho
 Dritan Stafsula
 Josephus Yenay

External links 
Tervarit Official Homepage

Football clubs in Finland
Sport in Oulu
1994 establishments in Finland